Soldier's Joy may refer to:
Morphine in archaic slang of the 1800s
Soldier's Joy (fiddle tune), a well-known Scottish and American musical piece
Soldier's Joy (house), a historic home in Nelson County, Virginia